Falkirk is a town in Scotland.

Falkirk may also refer to:

Council areas and Parliament constituencies
Falkirk (council area), Scottish local government council area
Falkirk Burghs (UK Parliament constituency)
Falkirk East (UK Parliament constituency)
Falkirk (UK Parliament constituency)
Falkirk West (UK Parliament constituency)

Battles
Battle of Falkirk (1298) 
Battle of Falkirk Muir (1746)

Other uses
Falkirk F.C., an association football team
Falkirk Steeple, a landmark which dominates the skyline of Falkirk in central Scotland
Falkirk Wheel, a rotating boat lift in central Scotland, connecting the Forth and Clyde Canal with the Union Canal
Falkirk Center for Faith and Liberty, a think tank operated by Liberty University
Leland Falkirk, character in Dean Koontz's novel Strangers